The 2014 Nicholls State Colonels football team represented Nicholls State University as a member of the Southland Conference during the 2014 NCAA Division I FCS football season. The Colonels were led by fifth-year head coach Charlie Stubbs for the first three games of the season and then by interim head coach Steve Axman for the final nine. Nicholls State compiled an overall record of 0–12 with a mark of 0–8 in conference play, placing last out of 11 teams in the Southland. The team played home games at John L. Guidry Stadium in Thibodaux, Louisiana.

After opening the season 0–3, Stubbs resigned on September 14, citing health issues for his decision. Three days later, the school named former Northern Arizona head coach Steve Axman as interim head coach for the remainder of the season. On November 21, following the season's conclusion, Tim Rebowe was named the tenth head football coach for Nicholls State. Rebowe had been an assistant coach at the University of Louisiana–Lafayette for the previous 11 seasons and assistant coach at Nicholls State from 1995 to 2000.

Schedule

References

Nicholls State
Nicholls Colonels football seasons
College football winless seasons
Nicholls State Colonels football